The United States Senate election of 1944 in New York was held on November 8, 1944. Incumbent Democratic Senator Robert F. Wagner was re-elected to a fourth term over Republican Thomas J. Curran. Wagner would not complete the term, resigning in June 1949 due to ill health.

General election

Candidates
 Thomas J. Curran, Secretary of State of New York (Republican)
 Eric Hass, candidate for Attorney General in 1942 (Socialist Labor)
 Robert F. Wagner, incumbent Senator (American Labor, Democratic, and Liberal)

Results

References

1944
New York
1944 New York (state) elections